The  is one of the landmarks in the city of Akita, Japan.  The sightseeing tower with 6,272 tempered glasses was completed in 1994.  It is located in the Tsuchizaki District, Akita, Akita Prefecture, Japan. The steel tower is the tallest structure in the 3 northern Tohoku prefectures with its observation deck at 100 metres (328 ft) and its spire at 143.6 metres (471 ft). The viewing platform provides a 360-degree panorama of the city and the mountains of Oga Peninsula, Taiheizan, and Mt. Chokai are visible.  Cable Networks Akita received the TV-U Yamagata broadcast from Takadateyama, Tsuruoka at this landmark in the past.

Events
 Cue sports at the 2001 World Games

Gallery

See also
Port of Akita
List_of_tallest_towers#Towers_between_100_and_200_metres_tall

References

External links
Official Homepage

2001 World Games
Towers completed in 1994
Buildings and structures in Akita (city)
Glass architecture
High-tech architecture
Modernist architecture in Japan
Observation towers in Japan
Rest areas in Japan
Tourist attractions in Akita Prefecture
1994 establishments in Japan